Life with Bonnie is an ABC television sitcom that originally aired from September 17, 2002 to April 9, 2004. The show outlined the life of character Bonnie Malloy, who juggled her personal life and her job as a daytime TV talk show host. The series was created by Bonnie Hunt and Don Lake and produced by Bob & Alice Productions, in association with Touchstone Television. The series had fair ratings in the first season, but struggled in the second season, resulting in its cancellation. Life With Bonnie was also shown on Living TV during ABC's airings.

Cast and characters

Main 
 Bonnie Hunt as Bonnie Malloy, the mother of two children (three in season one), a loving wife, and host of a local talk show. Bonnie tries to maintain a public image of the perfect wife and mother, but in reality her life is chaotic.
 Mark Derwin as Mark Malloy, a doctor, Bonnie's husband, and the father of their children. He looks on as she tries to balance her hectic life. Mark is much less concerned about what other people think than Bonnie is, which causes problems on occasion. He has a generally more professional demeanor, and sometimes does not understand why Bonnie continues to put up with annoying people in her life.
 Charlie Stewart as Charlie Malloy, Bonnie's son. Charlie shares most of his scenes with his friend Frankie. His role is small and usually unscripted, although he adds comedy to the show.
 Samantha Browne-Walters as Samantha Malloy (season one), Bonnie's eldest child, yet another ingredient in Bonnie's hectic life.  She was removed without explanation from the cast when season two started.
 Marianne Muellerleile as Gloria, Bonnie's live-in housekeeper/nanny. She was only intended to stay there until Charlie started school, but despite the fact that she actually provided little help, they could not let her leave because they had grown attached to her.
 David Alan Grier as David Bellows, the producer of the Morning Chicago show. David is most often seen yelling and frantically rushing to get things for the show in order while pushing his lectern around the studio.
 Anthony Russell as Tony Russo, Bonnie's affable piano player on Morning Chicago. Bonnie's housekeeper, Gloria, has a crush on Tony.
 Holly Wortell as Holly, Bonnie's make-up artist on Morning Chicago. She often gives advice on Bonnie's marriage issues and seems to date many men.
 Chris Barnes as Marv, the cue-card guy on Morning Chicago. Marv is very protective of Holly, who does not return his interest.
 Frankie Ryan Manriquez as Frankie, Charlie's best friend who spends most of his time at the Malloy home. He contributes many funny anecdotes about his screwed-up family.

Guest stars 
 Rip Taylor as "Rappin' Rip" (four episodes)
 Carl Reiner as Mr. Portinbody (three episodes)
 David Duchovny as Johnny Volcano (two episodes) 
 Martin Mull as Le Nord (two episodes)
 Tom Hanks as himself (episode: "What If?")
 Teri Garr as Mrs. Portinbody (episode: "Buy the Book")
 Jack LaLanne as himself (season-two premiere)
 The Smothers Brothers as contractors (episode: "Everything Old is New Again")
 Dick Van Patten as himself (episode: "It's a Wonderful Job")
 Jonathan Winters as Q.T. Marlens, a writer with multiple personalities (season one, episode nine)
 Robin Williams as Kevin Powalski (episode: "Psychic")
 Morgan York as Christine Harris (episode: "Dare To Be Different")

Episodes

Season 1 (2002–03)

Season 2 (2003–04)

External links 
 

2000s American sitcoms
2002 American television series debuts
2004 American television series endings
American Broadcasting Company original programming
English-language television shows
Television shows set in Chicago
Television series about television
Television series by ABC Studios